The  Miss Tennessee USA competition is the pageant that selects the representative for the state of Tennessee in the Miss USA pageant. The pageant is directed by Greenwood Productions under the ownership of Miss Tennessee USA 1989, Kimberly Payne Greenwood, since 1992. Since 1999, the pageant has been held at Austin Peay State University in Clarksville, Tennessee.

Lynnette Cole, Miss Tennessee USA 2000, and Rachel Smith, Miss Tennessee USA 2007, are the only titleholders to win the Miss USA title and both previously won the Miss Tennessee Teen USA title. Six Miss Tennessee USA titleholders have formerly competed at Miss Tennessee Teen USA, and six have competed at Miss America. One of these is Allison Alderson, a "triple crown" winner who has held the Miss Tennessee Teen USA, Miss Tennessee, and Miss Tennessee USA titles, competing at all three major pageants.

Regan Ringler was crowned Miss Tennessee USA 2023 on March 11, 2022. She will represent Tennessee for the title of Miss Teen USA 2023.

Gallery of titleholders

Results summary
Miss USAs: Lynnette Cole (2000), Rachel Smith (2007)
1st runners-up: Morgan Tandy High (1999), Ashley Durham (2011) 
2nd runners-up: Gail White (1962), Desiree Daniels (1984), Becca Lee (1996), Towanna Stone (1997) 
3rd runners-up: Jean Harper (1952), Donna Marie Ford (1970)
4th runners-up: Beth Hood (2003), Stephanie Culberson (2004)
Top 10/12:  Sharon Kay Steakley (1981), Sherly Deanice "Nise" Levy (1982), Stephanie Jane Potts (1988), Charita Moses (1990), Camila "Cammy" Gregory (1993), Leah Hulan (1994), Lisa Tollett (2001), Hailey Laine Brown (2008), Kristen Motil (2009), Tucker Perry (2010), Allee-Sutton Hethcoat (2017), Alexandra Harper (2018), Emily Suttle (2022)
Top 15/16/20: Stella Wilson (1956), Martha Boales (1958), Bobbie Lynn Morrow (1963), Mary Margaret Smith (1966), Nancy Brackhahn (1967), Sandra Force (1968), Lauren Grissom (2006), Jessica Hibler (2012), Kristy Landers Niedenfuer (2014), Elizabeth Pistole (2021)

Tennessee holds a record of 35 placements at Miss USA.

Awards

Miss Photogenic: Suzanna Timberlake (1978)
Best State Costume: Pat Kerr (1964), Elizabeth Pistole (2021)
Miss Congeniality: Bonnie Perkins (1965), Martha Browning (1985)
Style Award: Becca Lee (1996)
Best in Swimsuit: Lynnette Cole  (2000)

Winners 

Color key

Notes

References

External links
Official website

Tennessee
Tennessee culture
Women in Tennessee
Recurring events established in 1952
1952 establishments in Tennessee
Annual events in Tennessee